Vasilyevka is a rural locality (a selo) in Pisarevsky Selsoviet, Sharansky District, Bashkortostan, Russia. The population was 11 as of 2010. There is 1 street.

Geography 
Vasilyevka is located 34 km north of Sharan (the district's administrative centre) by road. Sakty is the nearest rural locality.

References 

Rural localities in Sharansky District